William Matthew Hart (1830-1908) was an Irish-born English bird illustrator and lithographer who worked for John Gould.

Hart started medical training, but was unable to complete his studies for financial reasons.  He began working for Gould in 1851, beginning an association that was to last thirty years.  Early during this period he made the patterns for the lithographic plates for Gould's work on hummingbirds, as well as working on The Birds of Great Britain with Henry Constantine Richter.  By 1870 Hart had become Gould's chief artist and lithographer.  After Gould's death in 1881, Hart was employed by Richard Bowdler Sharpe of the British Museum to complete Gould's work on the birds of New Guinea and to produce illustrations for Sharpe's monograph on the birds-of-paradise.

References

1830 births
1908 deaths
Scientific illustrators
English lithographers
People from Walworth
British bird artists
19th-century English painters
English male painters
19th-century English male artists